The 1960–61 Hellenic Football League season was the eighth in the history of the Hellenic Football League, a football competition in England.

Premier Division

The Premier Division featured 15 clubs which competed in the division last season, along with one new club:
Hazells, promoted from Division One

Also, Headington reserves changed name to Oxford United reserves.

League table

Division One

The Division One featured 9 clubs which competed in the division last season, along with 5 new clubs:
Chipping Norton Town, relegated from the Premier Division
Camberley United
Marston United
Didcot Town Reserves
A G R G Harwell

League table

References

External links
 Hellenic Football League

1960-61
H